Juan Pablo Mohr Prieto (born February 9, 1987; disappeared February 5, 2021) was a Chilean architect and mountaineer.

Biography 
In 2012, he graduated as an architect from the Diego Portales University and later devoted himself to taking mountaineering and rescue courses. He created the DeporteLibre Foundation, a non-profit organization that creates public sports infrastructure in abandoned spaces.

In 2017, Prieto and Sebastián Rojas managed to summit Annapurna, becoming the first Chileans to achieve this feat.  In 2019, Mohr was registered in the Guinness Records for being the first person to summit Lhotse and Everest without having to return to the Base camp in less than a week, without the help of Sherpas and without oxygen.  In October of the same year, he made an ascent under the same conditions to Dhaulagiri, also without supplementary oxygen and without the help of Sherpas.

After these ascents, Mohr began to outline a project to climb to the highest summit of each of Chile's sixteen regions and build mountain shelters in all of them, declaring that “as an architect I want to design and build shelters in the highest mountains. from each region to expand mountaineering in Chile", also developing mountaineering workshops and training for local communities with the aim of generating a system that allows the local administration of each refuge and generating activities that promote mountain culture, with the support of the Ministry of National Assets, the National Institute of Sports and the National Tourism Service.

Disappearance and discovery of body
In late 2020, Mohr traveled to K2 with Sergi Mingote to pioneer its promotion in the dead of winter. Mohr was with Mingote when he fell and died on January 16, 2021. After the death of his partner, Mohr decided to continue his attempt with the Italian mountaineer Tamara Lunger, who later could not continue either. Mohr then followed the route of ascent alongside Pakistani mountaineers Muhammad and Sajid Ali Sadpara and Icelander John Snorri Sigurjónsson. Sajid, Muhammad's 20-year-old son, was forced to return from the so-called 'bottleneck' area of K2 due to a malfunctioning oxygen regulator. On Friday, February 5, when the trio was preparing to conquer the summit, they lost contact with their GPS devices, presumably frozen by the extreme cold in the area. On Saturday the 6th, the three mountaineers were reported as missing and the search began with the help of helicopters from the Pakistani army that reached up to 7 thousand meters, but due to adverse weather conditions they had to suspend the rescue without seeing Mohr and his companions. He was declared dead on February 18, 2021.

See also
List of solved missing person cases
List of unsolved deaths

References 

1987 births
2021 deaths
2020s missing person cases
Chilean mountain climbers
Formerly missing people
Missing person cases in Pakistan
Mountaineering deaths on K2
Unsolved deaths